Eugoa bipunctata is a moth of the family Erebidae first described by Francis Walker in 1862. It is found on Borneo and in Singapore. The habitat consists of lowland forests.

References

bipunctata
Moths described in 1862